Events during the year 1928 in  Northern Ireland.

Incumbents
 Governor - 	 The Duke of Abercorn 
 Prime Minister - James Craig

Events
29 January – In Belfast, members of the nationalist opposition protest at the Ulster Unionist Party government's plan to abolish Proportional representation.
19 May – The foundation stone of the new Northern Ireland Parliament Building is laid at Stormont.
28 June – The keel of the first 1000 ft (300 m)-long ocean liner, Oceanic, for the White Star Line, is laid by Harland and Wolff in Belfast; construction is delayed, and will be cancelled in 1929.
The struggling Clogher Valley Railway taken over by a committee of management appointed by Tyrone and Fermanagh County Councils.
Work starts on building the Royal Courts of Justice, Belfast, completed in 1933.
Irish Linen Guild established.

Sport

Football
International
4 February Northern Ireland 1 - 2 Wales
25 February Scotland 0 - 1 Northern Ireland (in Glasgow)
22 October England 2 - 1 Northern Ireland (in Liverpool)

Irish League
Winners: Belfast Celtic

Irish Cup
Winners: Willowfield 1 - 0 Larne

Derry City are founded, entering the Irish League the following year.
7 April – Ballymena United F.C. are founded as Ballymena Football Club.

Births
19 February – Sam Cree, playwright (died 1980).
7 April – James White, science fiction novelist (died 1999).
18 April (in London) – Anne Dickson, Unionist Party of Northern Ireland MP.
17 June – Basil McIvor, Ulster Unionist politician (died 2004)
28 June – John Stewart Bell, physicist and originator of Bell's Theorem (died 1990).
25 July – Jimmy Jones, footballer (died 2014)
5 October – David Hammond, singer, filmmaker and broadcaster (died 2008).
30 October – Charles Brett, lawyer, journalist, author and founding member of the Ulster Architectural Heritage Society (died 2005).
19 December – Eve Bunting, author.

Deaths
19 November – Edward O'Neill, 2nd Baron O'Neill, politician (born 1839)

See also
1928 in Scotland
1928 in Wales

References